Sumbuk is a small town in the South Sikkim district of the Indian state of Sikkim.

Cities and towns in Namchi district